Dmosin Drugi  ("Dmosin the second") is a sołectwo in the administrative district of Gmina Dmosin, within Brzeziny County, Łódź Voivodeship, in central Poland. It is one of three sołectwos (Dmosin, Dmosin Pierwszy and Dmosin Drugi) making up the location commonly referred to as Dmosin.

The village has a population of 350.

References

Dmosin Drugi